Ikechukwu Okorie (born 18 November 1993) is a Nigerian footballer who plays as a defender for Al-Bahri in Iraq.

References

External links
 
 

Nigerian footballers
Nigerian expatriate footballers
1993 births
Living people
Kaduna United F.C. players
Enyimba F.C. players
Al Masry SC players
Amanat Baghdad players
Al-Bahri players
Expatriate footballers in Egypt
Expatriate footballers in Iraq
Nigerian expatriates in Iraq
Association football defenders
People from Zaria